The Taiwan green pigeon (Treron formosae) is a bird in the family Columbidae. The species was first described by Robert Swinhoe in 1863. It is found in Taiwan and Batanes in the Philippines. 

Its natural habitats are subtropical or tropical moist lowland forests and rural gardens. It is threatened by habitat loss.

Taxonomy 
The Ryukyu green pigeon (T. permagnus) of the Ryuku Islands was formerly considered conspecific, with both species being united together as the whistling green pigeon, but was split as a distinct species by the IOC in 2021.

There are thought to be two subspecies:

 T. f. formosae - endemic to Taiwan
 T. f. filipinus - endemic to the Philippines, found on Batanes and the Babuyan Islands

Description 

The Taiwan green pigeon is visually similar to the Wedge-tailed green pigeon, but with usually darker plumage.  Females are of various green shades throughout, and males have a distinctive purple-grey patch over the wings.  

EBird describes the bird as "A variable green-pigeon of subtropical and tropical lowland broadleaf evergreen forests. Ryukyu subspecies readily approachable, sometimes found in parks and gardens; Taiwan subspecies more timid. Ryukyu and Taiwan subspecies sometimes considered separate species, as Taiwan birds are much smaller and have a rufous cap. Similar to White-bellied Green-Pigeon, but feathers around the legs never white, face less yellowish, and white edges of undertail coverts narrower. Song a low, whistling poo-aa-poooo, rising and trilling at end, recalling a bamboo flute."

Habitat and Conservation Status 

IUCN has assessed this bird as near threatened. This species' main threat is habitat loss and hunting.

References

Taiwan green pigeon
Birds of Taiwan
Fauna of Batanes
Taiwan green pigeon
Taxonomy articles created by Polbot